Epidendrium billeeanum, commonly known as the Yellow sea snail or the Golden wentletrap, is a species of small predator and ectoparasite sea snail, a marine gastropod mollusc in the family Epitoniidae, the wentletraps.

Distribution
This species is widespread throughout the tropical waters of the Indo-Pacific and the occidental Pacific Ocean including the Red Sea, Hawaii and the Galapagos.

Description
The Golden wentletrap has a bright yellow helicoidal shell which grows up to 1 cm in length. It is often found on corals from genus Tubastraea on which it feeds.

References

External links
 
http://www.marinespecies.org/aphia.php?p=taxdetails&id=523762

Epitoniidae
Gastropods described in 1965